Juan Velázquez Tlacotzin was an Aztec leader in Tenochtitlan, during the final decades of the Aztec Empire.  He then was the first post-Spanish conquest indigenous ruler of Tenochtitlan from 1525 to 1526.

Biography

Aztec era
Tlacotzin was a Cihuacoatl (counselor) during the rule of Moctezuma II and of Cuauhtémoc.

Spanish era
Tlacotzin was captured and later tortured by Hernán Cortés, along with Cuauhtémoc, to reveal the location of Royal Treasures and gold of the Imperial Family. 

After the execution of Emperor Cuauhtémoc he was chosen as the Cuauhtemoc's successor by Hernán Cortés. Immediately after the execution of Cuauhtemoc, Cortés ordered Tlacotzin be dressed as a Spaniard, given a sword and a white horse as symbols of his new position as Aztec ruler. Tlacotzin was also baptized by the Spanish as don Juan Velásquez.  

Although Tlacotzin was to govern like a tlatoani, his non-noble birth (and lack of connection to the previous royal dynasty) as well as him not going through the traditional investiture ceremony meant that he was regarded by the Nahua subjects as cuauhtlatoani ("eagle ruler"; a non-dynastic interim ruler) instead.

He accompanied Cortés on his three-year expedition, but died in 1526 (8 Tochtli) while on it, of an unknown sickness in Nochixtlan. Cortés immediately chose Andrés de Tapia Motelchiuh as his successor.

See also

List of Tenochtitlan rulers
Aztec emperors family tree
Spanish conquest of the Aztec Empire

References

Anales de Tlatelolco (1540)

External links

Aztec nobility
Tenochca tlatoque
16th-century monarchs in North America
16th-century indigenous people of the Americas
16th-century Mexican people
Year of birth unknown
1526 deaths

Nobility of the Americas